Phyllobrotica sequoiensis is a species in the family Chrysomelidae ("leaf beetles"), in the order Coleoptera ("beetles").
It is found in North America.

References

Further reading
 Arnett, R.H. Jr., M. C. Thomas, P. E. Skelley and J. H. Frank. (eds.). (2002). American Beetles, Volume II: Polyphaga: Scarabaeoidea through Curculionoidea. CRC Press LLC, Boca Raton, FL.
 Richard E. White. (1983). Peterson Field Guides: Beetles. Houghton Mifflin Company.
 Riley, Edward G., Shawn M. Clark, and Terry N. Seeno (2003). "Catalog of the leaf beetles of America north of Mexico (Coleoptera: Megalopodidae, Orsodacnidae and Chrysomelidae, excluding Bruchinae)". Coleopterists Society Special Publication no. 1, 290.
 Ross H. Arnett. (2000). American Insects: A Handbook of the Insects of America North of Mexico. CRC Press.

Galerucinae
Beetles described in 1956
Taxa named by Doris Holmes Blake